Morum grande is a species of sea snail, a marine gastropod mollusk in the family Harpidae, the harp snails.

Description

Distribution
The snail lives near the Philippines in the Benthic zone.

References

Harpidae